Dušan Karol and Jaroslav Pospíšil were the defending champions, but Pospíšil didn't take part in these championships this year.
Karol partnered up with Olivier Charroin, but they were eliminated in the first round.
Dieter Kindlmann and Marcel Zimmermann defeated Michael Berrer and Philipp Oswald in the final 6–4, 2–6, [10–4].

Seeds

Draw

Draw

References
 Doubles Draw

Oberstaufen Cup - Doubles
Oberstaufen Cup